Thomas Samuel James Mehew (born 26 May 2001) is an English footballer who plays as a midfielder for Chippenham Town.

Career

Bristol Rovers
During his time in the academy at Bristol Rovers, Mehew earned a lot of praise and was U18 Player of the season for the 2018-19 season.

He made his senior debut for Bristol Rovers on 8 September 2020 against Walsall in the EFL Trophy, and scored his first professional goal in the process. Three days later on 11 September 2020, Mehew signed a new two-year contract extension with an option for a further year. On 6 October, Mehew again started in the EFL Trophy and again he opened the scoring. On 9 May 2021, Mehew came off of the bench to make his league debut in the final match of the season as already-relegated Rovers lost 1–0 to Blackpool.

Mehew was released at the end of the 2021–22 season following Rovers' promotion to League One.

Loan Spells
On 20 November 2020, Mehew joined National League South side Bath City on loan until early January, joining his young teammate from Bristol Rovers, Lucas Tomlinson. He made his debut the following day as Bath lost 1–0 late on to Hampton & Richmond Borough. On 16 January 2021, Mehew was sent off for a second bookable offence in a 1–0 defeat to league below Peterborough Sports in the FA Trophy Fourth Round, his second dismissal of his loan spell after also being sent off in a league victory over Dorking Wanderers. On 19 January 2021, he scored his first goal for the Romans, opening the scoring in a 2–1 victory over Havant & Waterlooville.

On 26 October 2021, Mehew returned to Bath City on a one-month youth loan deal.

On 10 December 2021, Mehew joined Gloucester City on a one-month loan deal. His move to the National League North side saw him link up with former Development Squad manager at Rovers, Lee Mansell.

On 11 January 2022, Mehew joined Swindon Supermarine on a one-month loan deal. In February, this was extended until the end of the season.

Chippenham Town
On 24 March 2022, Mehew was recalled from Swindon Supermarine, joining Chippenham Town the following day until the end of the season.

In July 2022, Mehew joined Chippenham Town on a permanent basis following his release from Bristol Rovers.

Personal life
Mehew’s father David Mehew was a former professional who also played for Bristol Rovers and his brother Olly was formerly in both the Bristol Rovers and Forest Green Rovers youth academy and currently plays for Tiverton Town.

Career statistics

References

2001 births
Living people
Footballers from Bristol
English footballers
Association football midfielders
Bristol Rovers F.C. players
Yate Town F.C. players
Frome Town F.C. players
Stratford Town F.C. players
Bath City F.C. players
Gloucester City A.F.C. players
Swindon Supermarine F.C. players
Chippenham Town F.C. players
Southern Football League players
National League (English football) players
English Football League players